Kagulu  Ntambi Tebukywereke was Kabaka of the Kingdom of Buganda, between 1734 and 1736. He was the twentieth (20th) Kabaka of Buganda.

Claim to the throne
He was the eldest son of Kabaka Ndawula Nsobya, Kabaka of Buganda between 1724 and 1734. His mother was Naggujja of the Njovu clan, the second (2nd) of his father's seven (7) wives. He ascended to the throne upon the death of his father. He established his capital at Bulizo.

Married life
He married one wife, who bore him two sons.

Issue
 Prince (Omulangira) Kayima Ssekindi
 Prince (Omulangira) Sematimba. Prince Sematimba had a son; Prince (Omulangira) Kayemba Sekitamu. Prince Sekitamu, in turn had two sons: (a) Prince (Omulangira) Lubugu and (b) Prince (Omulangira) Sekitamu. He had a son: (A) Prince (Omulangira) Name Unknown. The unknown prince in turn had a son: Prince (Omulangira) Kikindu. Prince Kakindu died before 1939, having had  a son; Prince (Omulangira) Isaaka Yali-Aseka.

The final years
Kabaka Kagulu Tebukywereke was deposed by his sister, Princess Ndege, the Nassolo. He fled to Buto. He was killed by drowning in Lake Nalubaale, on the orders of Nassolo. His body was retrieved and buried at Bbuga, Busiro.

Quotes
"… his dominant trait was lack of respect for men. His despotic rule and the barbarous treatment of the men who worked in the capital caused unrest and discontent because it affected a very large section of the community."
 MM Semakula Kiwanuka, A History of Buganda, 1971

Succession table

See also
 Kabaka of Buganda

References

External links
List of the Kings of Buganda

Kabakas of Buganda
18th-century monarchs in Africa